A Present for the Future is the second studio album by guitarist Frank Gambale, released in 1987 by Legato Records and reissued in 2000 by Wombat Records. The third track, "Stephanie", is renamed "Serenity" on the reissue. Harpist Stephanie Bennett was Gambale's ex-wife and was mentioned in the liner notes of all his albums until Passages (1994).

Track listing

Personnel

Frank Gambale – guitar, guitar synthesizer, keyboard (tracks 1, 4), strings, bass (track 5), mixing, production
Kei Akagi – keyboard (tracks 2, 7), Rhodes piano
Tom Coster – keyboard (track 3), synthesizer
Jack Kelly – drums (except track 6)
Steve Smith – drums (track 6)
Steve Reid – percussion
Steve Kershisnik – bass (except track 5)
John Patitucci – bass solo (track 6)
Steve Tavaglione – Steinerphone, tenor saxophone, soprano saxophone, flute
Stephanie Bennett – electric harp
Alan Hirshberg – engineering, mixing (track 6)
Jon Googenheim – engineering
Robert M. Biles – mixing (except track 6)
Jeff Sanders – mastering
Mark Varney – executive production

References

Frank Gambale albums
1987 albums